Rossett Hall is a mid-eighteenth century Grade II listed Georgian building situated in the village of Rossett, Wrexham County Borough, in the north of Wales. A former manor house, it is now a hotel under the Everbright Group.

History
It was built in 1750 by John Boydell (1720–1804) as a country retreat for his family. Boydell was an engraver and publisher who became Lord Mayor of London in 1790.

Presently, Rossett Hall is operated by Everbright Group Hotels, it was a formerly independently owned hotel, with the hotel retaining much of the original manor house interior, such as the stone cantilevered staircase, grand chandelier, classical fireplace and lounge rooms.

References

Houses completed in 1750
Buildings and structures in Wrexham County Borough
Grade II listed buildings in Wrexham County Borough
Hotels in Wales
Grade II listed hotels
Country houses in Wales